William Patrick Corgan Jr. (born March 17, 1967) is an American musician, singer, songwriter, and professional wrestling promoter. He is best known as the lead singer, primary songwriter, guitarist, and only permanent member of the rock band Smashing Pumpkins. He is currently the owner and promoter of the National Wrestling Alliance (NWA).

Corgan formed Smashing Pumpkins in Chicago in 1988 along with guitarist James Iha, followed by bassist D'arcy Wretzky and drummer Jimmy Chamberlin. Strong album sales and large-scale tours propelled the band's increasing fame in the 1990s until their break-up in 2000. Corgan started a new band called Zwan, and after their demise he released a solo album, TheFutureEmbrace, in 2005 and a collection of poetry, Blinking with Fists, before reforming Smashing Pumpkins. The new version of the band, consisting of Corgan and a revolving lineup, has released and toured new albums extensively since 2007. In October 2017, Corgan released Ogilala, his first solo album in over a decade. His latest album, Cotillions, was released on November 22, 2019.

In 2011, Corgan founded Resistance Pro Wrestling. He later joined Total Nonstop Action Wrestling in 2015, becoming its president in August 2016. After leaving TNA in November 2016, he purchased the NWA in October 2017, transforming it from a brand licensing organization to a singular promotion.

Early life
William Patrick Corgan Jr. was born at Columbus Hospital in the Lincoln Park neighborhood of Chicago on March 17, 1967, the oldest son of guitarist William Dale Corgan (1947-2021) and his wife Martha Louise Maes Corgan Lutz. He was raised Catholic and is of Irish and German-Swiss descent. His parents had one more son, Ricky, before divorcing in 1970. His father was remarried to a flight attendant, and Corgan and his brother went to live with them in Glendale Heights, Illinois. Corgan alleges that his stepmother was abusive to him, both physically and emotionally. He developed a protective bond with his younger paternal half-brother, Jesse, who had special needs as a child. When Corgan's father and stepmother separated, all three boys lived alone with their stepmother, and both of his birth parents lived separately within an hour's drive.

Corgan described his father as a "drug dealing, gun-toting, musician [and] mad man". Although this had a huge negative impact on his childhood, in retrospect he respects his father as a great musician.

Corgan, who grew much faster than his fellow students, was a strong athlete in elementary school. In addition to being a member of his baseball team at Marquardt Middle School, he amassed over 10,000 baseball cards and listened to every Chicago Cubs game on the radio. However, by the time he began attending Glenbard North High School, his athletic prowess had greatly diminished. He decided to start playing guitar after seeing a Flying V when he went over to a friend's house. Corgan gave his savings to his father, who bought him a used Les Paul knock-off. His father encouraged him to listen to Jeff Beck and Jimi Hendrix but offered little other support, so Corgan taught himself to play the instrument. His musical interests in his formative years included hard rock like Guts-era John Cale, heavy metal pioneers Black Sabbath, and mainstream rock like Van Halen, Queen, Boston, ELO, Rush, and Cheap Trick. In high school, Corgan discovered alternative rock through Bauhaus and The Cure. He performed in a string of bands in high school and graduated as an honor student. Despite grant and scholarship offers from a number of schools, and a tuition fund left by his grandmother, Corgan decided to pursue music full-time.

Music career

1985–1987: Early career
Not finding the Chicago music scene to his liking, Corgan moved to St. Petersburg, Florida in 1985 with his first major band, The Marked (so named for the conspicuous birthmarks of both Corgan and drummer Ron Roesing). Not finding success in St. Petersburg, the band dissolved; Corgan moved back to Chicago to live with his father. From 1987 to 1988, he played guitar in Chicago band Deep Blue Dream, which also featured future Static-X frontman Wayne Static. He left the band to focus on The Smashing Pumpkins.

1988–2000: The Smashing Pumpkins

Upon his return to Chicago, Corgan had already devised his next project – a band that would be called The Smashing Pumpkins. Corgan met guitarist James Iha while working in a record store, and the two began recording demos, which Corgan describes as "gloomy little goth-pop records". He met bassist D'arcy Wretzky after a local show, arguing with her about a band that had just played, The Dan Reed Network. Soon after, the Smashing Pumpkins were formed. The trio began to play together at local clubs with a drum machine for percussion. To secure a show at the Metro in Chicago, the band recruited drummer Jimmy Chamberlin, and played for the first time as a quartet on October 5, 1988.

The addition of Chamberlin drove the band in a heavier direction almost immediately. On the band's debut album, Gish (1991), the band integrated psychedelic rock and heavy metal into their sound. Gish fared better than expected, but the follow-up, Siamese Dream, released on Virgin Records in 1993, became a multi-platinum hit. The band became known for internal drama during this period, with Corgan frequently characterized in the music press as a "control freak" due to rumors that Corgan played all the guitar and bass parts on Siamese Dream (a rumor that Corgan later confirmed as true). Despite this, the album was well received by critics, and the songs "Today", "Cherub Rock", and "Disarm" became hits.

The band's 1995 follow-up effort, the double album Mellon Collie and the Infinite Sadness, was more successful, spawning a string of hit singles. According to Jon Pareles from The New York Times, Corgan wanted to "lose himself and find himself..." in this album. The album was nominated for seven Grammy awards that year, and would eventually be certified ten times platinum in the United States. The song "1979" was Corgan's biggest hit to date, reaching No. 1 on Billboard's modern rock and mainstream rock charts. Their appearance on Saturday Night Live on November 11, 1995, to promote this material (their second appearance on the show overall) was also the television debut appearance of Corgan's shaved head, which he has maintained consistently since.

On July 12, 1996, touring keyboardist Jonathan Melvoin died in a Manhattan hotel room of a heroin overdose after he and Chamberlin used the drug together. Chamberlin was later arrested on a misdemeanor drug possession charge. The Smashing Pumpkins made the decision to fire Chamberlin and continue as a trio. This shakeup, coupled with Corgan going through a divorce and the death of his mother, influenced the somber mood of the band's next album, 1998's Adore. Featuring a darker, more subdued and heavily electronic sound at a time when alternative rock was declining in mainstream cachet, Adore divided both critics and fans, resulting in a significant decrease in album sales (it sold 1.3 million discs in the US).

Chamberlin was reunited with the band in 1999. In 2000, they released Machina/The Machines of God, a concept album on which the band deliberately played to their public image. Critics were again divided, and sales were lower than before; Machina is the second lowest-selling commercially released Smashing Pumpkins album to date, with U.S. sales of 583,000 units up to 2005. During the recording for Machina, Wretzky quit the band and was replaced for the upcoming tour by former Hole bassist Melissa Auf der Maur. In 2000 the band released Machina II/The Friends & Enemies of Modern Music free over the Internet and broke up at the end of the year, playing their last show on December 2, 2000, at the Cabaret Metro.

2001–2005: Zwan and solo career
Following a brief stint touring with New Order in the summer, Corgan reunited with Chamberlin to form the band Zwan with Corgan's old friend Matt Sweeney in late 2001. According to Neil Strauss of New York Times, during his few live performances with the band, Corgan says "is still a work in progress". The lineup was completed with guitarist David Pajo and bassist Paz Lenchantin. The band had two distinct incarnations, the primary approach being an upbeat rock band with a three-guitar-driven sound, the second, a folk and gospel inspired acoustic side with live strings. The quintet performed throughout 2002, and their debut album, Mary Star of the Sea, was released in early 2003 to generally positive reviews. In the midst of their supporting tour for the album, mounting conflict between Corgan and Chamberlin, and the other band members led to the cancellation of the rest of the tour as the band entered an apparent hiatus, formally breaking up in September 2003.

In 2004, Corgan began writing revealing autobiographical posts on his website and his MySpace page, blaming Iha for the breakup of the Smashing Pumpkins, calling Wretzky "a mean spirited drug addict," and criticizing his former Zwan bandmates' fixation with "indie cred" and calling them "filthy", opportunistic, and selfish.

On September 17, 2003, Billy presented his poetry at the Art Institute of Chicago's Rubloff Auditorium. In late 2004, Corgan published Blinking with Fists, a book of poetry. Despite mixed reviews, the book debuted on The New York Times Best Seller list. Around this time, he began posting autobiographical writings online under the title The Confessions of Billy Corgan.

Also in 2004, he began a solo music career, landing on an electronic/shoegaze/alternative rock sound for his first solo album, TheFutureEmbrace, co-produced and arranged by Bon Harris of Nitzer Ebb. Released on June 21, 2005, through Reprise Records, it garnered mixed reviews from the press and only sold 69,000 copies. Corgan toured behind his solo album with a touring band that included Linda Strawberry, Brian Liesegang and Matt Walker in 2005. This tour was not as extensive as previous Smashing Pumpkins or Zwan tours. Prior to recording TheFutureEmbrace, Corgan had recorded some 72 songs inspired by Chicago history for the largely acoustic ChicagoSongs project, which have yet to be released.

2005–present: The Smashing Pumpkins revival
In 2005, Corgan took out a full-page ad in Chicago's two major newspapers (Chicago Tribune and The Chicago Sun-Times) revealing his desire to re-form the Smashing Pumpkins. Several days later, Jimmy Chamberlin accepted Corgan's offer for a reunion.

On April 20, 2006, the band's official website confirmed that the group was indeed reuniting. The re-formed Smashing Pumpkins went into studio for much of 2006 and early 2007, and performed its first show in seven years on May 22, 2007, with new members Ginger Pooley (bass) and Jeff Schroeder (guitar) replacing Wretzky and Iha. The new album, titled Zeitgeist, was released in the United States on July 10, 2007, and debuted at No. 2 on the Billboard charts. Corgan and the rest of the Pumpkins toured extensively throughout 2007 and 2008, also releasing the EP American Gothic and the singles "G.L.O.W." and "Superchrist". Chamberlin left the band in March 2009, and Corgan elected to continue under the name.

In summer 2009, Corgan formed the band Spirits in the Sky to play a tribute concert to the late Sky Saxon of the Seeds. He toured with the band, composed of ex-Catherine member and "Superchrist" producer Kerry Brown, the Electric Prunes bassist Mark Tulin, Strawberry Alarm Clock keyboardist Mark Weitz, frequent Corgan collaborator Linda Strawberry, flautist Kevin Dippold, "Superchrist" violinist Ysanne Spevack, saxist Justin Norman, new Pumpkins drummer Mike Byrne, and Jane's Addiction guitarist Dave Navarro, playing covers and new Pumpkins material at several clubs in California. At the end of the tour, Corgan, Byrne, Tulin, and Brown headed back to Chicago to begin work on the new Smashing Pumpkins album, Teargarden by Kaleidyscope. The lineup at the time which included new bassist Nicole Fiorentino, toured through much of 2010, then spent 2011 recording the "album-within-an-album" Oceania and mounting tours of the United States and Europe. However, Byrne and Fiorentino would later leave the band in 2014.

On May 15, 2014, Corgan released AEGEA, a new solo record of experimental recordings he made in 2007 Limited to 250 vinyl copies, the album was mostly sold online, with a few copies sold at Madame Zuzu's, a tea house he owns and operates in Highland Park, a suburb of Chicago.

On July 25, 2014, Corgan also released the tapes from his "Siddhartha" show from March 2014, much in the vein of AEGEA. The set was expected to contain between 5 and 6 discs.

During the summer 2014, Corgan recorded The Smashing Pumpkins's tenth studio album, Monuments to an Elegy, with Tommy Lee and Jeff Schroeder. The album was released in early December 2014.

In September 2015, Corgan started a blog of vintage photographs that he himself curated, and which he called "People and Their Cars". The website also included an email listing for the blog, titled "The Red Border Club". This list was to be used for information on upcoming People and Their Cars and "Hexestential" books and merchandise, along with access to additional images.

In October 2017, he released a new solo album titled Ogilala.

In July 2018, The Smashing Pumpkins embarked on a reunion tour, the Shiny And Oh So Bright Tour, with a focus on performing material from their first five studio albums. The lineup consists of himself, James Iha, Jimmy Chamberlin, and Jeff Schroeder. Former bassist D'arcy Wretzky was not a part of the lineup, reportedly due to unresolved tension between her and Corgan. Wretzky has stated that Corgan offered her a contract but later retracted the offer, saying that "we also have to balance the forces at play... there is no room for error." After Wretzky released text messages between her and Corgan, a feud ensued, with each party attacking each other with biting remarks.

On November 22, 2019, Corgan released his third solo album Cotillions, which he called "a labor of love". He also said, "This is absolutely an album from my heart."

On July 14, 2022, Corgan and his partner, Chloe Mendel announced that they would host a livestream charity show on July 27 to benefit the victims of the July 4 Highland Park, Ill., shooting.

Professional wrestling promoter

Resistance Pro Wrestling (2011–2014)
In 2011 Corgan formed a Chicago-based independent wrestling promotion called Resistance Pro. Two years later, in 2013, he starred in a commercial for Walter E. Smithe Furniture, using the platform to promote his wrestling company.

In March 2014 it was reported that Corgan was in discussions with American television channel AMC to develop an unscripted reality series about Resistance Pro. The premise being a behind-the-scenes look at the promotion as Corgan "takes over creative direction for the independent wrestling company". The show was given the green light by AMC, under the working title of "Untitled Billy Corgan Wrestling Project," the same month.

Total Nonstop Action Wrestling (2015–2016)
In April 2015 Corgan became the new Senior Producer of Creative and Talent Development for Total Nonstop Action Wrestling (TNA), where his role was to "develop characters and create story lines", which he has called "a dream come true". In August 2016, Corgan took over as the promotion's new president.

In November 2016 Corgan had left TNA after disputes about not being paid on time, and subsequently, Anthem Sports & Entertainment Corp and Impact Ventures, parent company of TNA Impact Wrestling, provided a credit facility to TNA to fund operations. In 2016, he loaned money to Anthem Sports & Entertainment to fund TNA, and they promised to pay him back. On November 11, Corgan and Anthem signed a settlement, with Anthem repaying TNA's loan from Corgan.

Newly appointed TNA/Impact Wrestling President Ed Nordholm credits the invention of and the vision behind the Matt Hardy Broken gimmick to Jeremy Borash, David Lagana and Billy Corgan. While Borash specifically had the most input into the gimmick of the three aside from Matt, the Hardy family deny that Borash was the sole person behind the gimmick.

National Wrestling Alliance (2017–present)
In May 2017, Corgan purchased the National Wrestling Alliance (NWA), including its name, rights, trademarks and championship belts. Corgan's ownership took effect on October 1, 2017.

Personal life

Mental health
For much of his life, Corgan has struggled with anxiety, depression, panic attacks, self-harm, obsessive-compulsive disorder, and suicidal ideation. He attributes these problems to the abuse he endured as a child at the hands of his father and stepmother, as well as other personal issues. He has since become an advocate for abuse support networks.

Involvement with sports
Corgan is a keen supporter of the Chicago Cubs, and an occasional commentator on the team for WXRT DJ Lin Brehmer. He has appeared at many Cubs games, occasionally throwing the ceremonial first pitch or singing "Take Me Out to the Ballgame". He is also a fan of the Chicago Bulls, Chicago Blackhawks and Chicago Bears, and became personal friends with Dennis Rodman and Chris Chelios. He is an avid professional wrestling fan, and appeared at an ECW event wielding an acoustic guitar as a weapon. In 2008, the Pumpkins song "Doomsday Clock" was used by ROH for promotional videos. On April 26, 2010, Corgan appeared on the SIRIUS Satellite Radio program Right After Wrestling with Arda Ocal to discuss his love for wrestling and the importance of unique theme songs for characters. On August 26, 2010, he took part in a storyline with AAA during a concert for MTV World Stage. As far as other entertainment, Corgan once commented that all he watches on TV are "sports and the Three Stooges". In March 2008, he was spotted in the crowd at the final day of the cricket test match between New Zealand and England.

Spiritual beliefs
Corgan accepts some elements of Catholicism, Buddhism and Ken Wilber's spiritual ideas. In 2009, he launched Everything From Here to There, an interfaith website that is devoted to "Mind-Body-Soul" integration. He mentions praying each morning and night to be able to see through Jesus Christ's eyes and feel with his heart. An analysis of the symbolism of Corgan's lyrics considered the blend of beliefs he has cited in various interviews, which include ideas about religion, multiple dimensions, and psychic phenomena. In an interview on the Howard Stern Show, Corgan claimed to have once had an encounter with a person who had the ability to shapeshift.

Family and romantic relationships
Corgan's mother Martha died in December 1996. The song "For Martha", from Adore, was written in her memory. In the early 2000s Corgan named his label Martha's Music after her as well. A picture of Martha as a young girl sitting on a fake moon at Riverview Park is featured on the flipside of the Siamese Dream booklet.

In 1991, Corgan briefly dated musician and actress Courtney Love.  In an interview on The Howard Stern Show, Corgan confessed that he arranged for Love's band to stay in his Chicago apartment in order to meet her, an encounter he had longed after seeing her photograph on the back of Hole's new single. Their relationship ended on October 12, 1991, when Love found out that Corgan had another relationship.

In 1993, Corgan married art conservator and artist Chris Fabian, his longtime on-again, off-again girlfriend. They were married at a small ceremony at his house in Wrigleyville. Corgan and Fabian separated in late 1995. Corgan filed for divorce in December 1996 on grounds of "irreconcilable differences," and the divorce was granted in 1997. Corgan refused to discuss the marriage for years, only allowing that it was "unhappy." In 2005 he described the circumstances of his marriage in depth via his personal blog.

In late 1995, Corgan started dating Ukrainian photographer Yelena Yemchuk, who later contributed to several Smashing Pumpkins videos and album art. He continued to date Yemchuk until around 2004. According to Corgan, his breakup with her contributed to the themes of his 2005 solo release TheFutureEmbrace. In 2005, Corgan dated musician Emilie Autumn for a number of months. The pair collaborated on multiple occasions during this time, with Autumn providing vocals and violin on his solo album and costume for a supporting music video.

In early 2006, Corgan moved in with Courtney Love and her daughter. According to Love, he had his own wing in her Hollywood Hills mansion. Two years later, Love criticized him publicly over his alleged refusal to attend her daughter's sweet 16 party. After they parted ways, Corgan stated in a March 2010 interview, "I have no interest in supporting [Love] in any way, shape or form. You can't throw enough things down the abyss with a person like that." Shortly after, when her band's album Nobody's Daughter was released, Corgan used Twitter to post anger-filled rants against her in reference to two songs he had written, "Samantha" and "How Dirty Girls Get Clean", which ended up on the album without his permission. Love then wrote an apology to him on her Facebook account, but the feud continued. Corgan took to Twitter to rant against her again. She responded to him on Twitter, saying, "All i am is nice about you so if you wanna be mean be mean i don't feel anything. i have too much to feel dear." In 2008, he blamed his dedication to music for what he called "a bad marriage and seven bad girlfriends in a row". The two eventually reconciled, and Love was invited to perform at Smashing Pumpkins 30th Anniversary Show. In 2020, Corgan told Los Angeles Times that only a few people really matter to him and that Courtney is one of them, describing their relationship as a family bond. 

In 2009, Corgan was linked with pop star Jessica Simpson. He started dating Australian singer Jessica Origliasso in 2010, and remained in a relationship with her until early June 2012. Origliasso blamed their split on their careers forcing them to spend too much time apart.

He began dating Chloe Mendel in 2013. She gave birth to a son named Augustus Juppiter Corgan on November 16, 2015. Their second child, a daughter named Philomena Clementine Corgan, was born on October 2, 2018.

On December 19, 2021, Corgan's father, William Dale Corgan, died at age 74.

Political beliefs
In 1998, Corgan said he had not participated in an election since 1992, when he voted for Bill Clinton.
Following the election of Barack Obama in 2008, Corgan stated: "I'm very proud of my country right now for doing the right thing." He has since said that he was disappointed with Obama's presidency, and that he lacks faith in both major political parties. In 2009, he posted a transcript of a webcast by political activist Lyndon LaRouche to the official Smashing Pumpkins forum. On March 10, 2009, Corgan testified in front of Congress on behalf of the musicFIRST Coalition. He spoke in favor of H.R. 848, the Performance Rights Act, which gives musicians and artists their share of compensation when their music is played on radio stations.

In an interview with radio host and conspiracy theorist Alex Jones in 2016, Corgan voiced discontent with "social justice warriors", comparing them to Maoists, cult members, and the Ku Klux Klan, and calling their actions a threat to freedom of speech. In 2018, he called himself a "free-market libertarian capitalist".

Diet

Corgan adopted a pescetarian diet in 2013, and stated in 2017 that he had begun following a vegan and gluten-free diet. In 2012, he opened a tea house in Ravinia, Highland Park called Madame Zuzu's Tea House, which closed in 2018 and reopened in downtown Highland Park in 2020.

Collaborations

In addition to performing, Corgan has produced albums for Ric Ocasek, The Frogs, and Catherine. He shared songwriting credit on several songs on Hole's 1998 album Celebrity Skin; the title track became Corgan's second No. 1 modern rock hit. He also acted as a consultant for Marilyn Manson during the recording of the album Mechanical Animals. He has produced three soundtracks for the movies Ransom (1996), Stigmata (1999) and Spun (2002) in which he appeared as a doctor.

Corgan appeared at the 1996 Rock and Roll Hall of Fame ceremonies. He inducted one of his biggest musical influences, Pink Floyd. He played acoustic guitar during the ceremony with Pink Floyd, when they performed their song "Wish You Were Here".

In particular, Corgan guided and collaborated with three bands in the 2000s—Breaking Benjamin (during sessions for 2004's We Are Not Alone), Taproot (for Blue-Sky Research, 2005), and Sky Saxon.

In 2010, Corgan claimed co-writing credit (with ex-girlfriend Courtney Love) on at least two of the songs on Hole's final album Nobody's Daughter and tried to assert a right of approval before the album could be released. Corgan had helped develop the album during its early stages. The album was released without the writing controversy ever being litigated or publicly resolved.

Corgan appeared as a guest vocalist on the song "Loki Cat" on Jimmy Chamberlin's first solo album, Life Begins Again, and Chamberlin played drums for the song "DIA" on Corgan's solo debut, where Robert Smith from The Cure teamed up with Corgan to do a cover of the Bee Gees' "To Love Somebody". In 2007, Corgan provided vocals on the Scorpions' song "The Cross", on their album Humanity: Hour I. In 2010 Corgan featured on Ray Davies' album See My Friends on the album's closer, a mash-up of the Kinks songs "All Day and All of the Night" and "Destroyer". He also contributed his guitar work on "Did You Miss Me" by The Veronicas. Corgan has also collaborated with Tony Iommi, Blindside, David Bowie (singing "All the Young Dudes" with Bowie at Bowie's 50th birthday party), New Order and Marianne Faithfull.

Musical style and influences
When asked in a 1994 Rolling Stone interview about his influences, Corgan replied:

Corgan wrote six articles for Guitar World in 1995, and his solos for "Cherub Rock" and "Geek U.S.A." were included on their list of the top guitar solos of all time. AllMusic said "Starla" "proves that Corgan was one of the finest (and most underrated) rock guitarists of the '90s", while Rolling Stone called him and his Smashing Pumpkins bandmates "ruthless virtuosos". His solo for "Soma" was No. 24 on Rolling Stone list of the top guitar solos. He is a fan of Eddie Van Halen and interviewed him in 1996 for Guitar World. Other guitarists Corgan rates highly include Uli Jon Roth, Tony Iommi, Ritchie Blackmore, Leslie West, Dimebag Darrell and Robin Trower.

His bass playing, which has featured on nearly every Smashing Pumpkins album, was influenced by post-punk figures like Peter Hook and Simon Gallup.

Corgan has praised Radiohead, saying "if they're not the best band in the world, then they're one of the best". He is also a fan of Pantera and appeared briefly in their home video 3 Watch It Go. Other favorites include Depeche Mode, Siouxsie and the Banshees, Rush, Pink Floyd, Led Zeppelin, The Cure, Metallica, Slayer, Queen, Electric Light Orchestra, Dinosaur Jr., My Bloody Valentine, and Spiritualized. Corgan stated in 1997 that upon hearing the U2 song "New Year's Day", at 16, "[U2] quickly became the most important band in the world to me." Corgan particularly went out of his way to praise Rush in his interview for Rush: Beyond the Lighted Stage, a documentary on the band, where he criticized mainstream reviewers for consciously marginalizing the band and their influence, and highlighted the fact that many of his musical peers were influenced by Rush.

He has listed his artistic influences as William S. Burroughs, Pablo Picasso, Jimi Hendrix, Jack Kerouac, and Philip K. Dick.

Instruments

Corgan played (during the Gish-Siamese Dream era) a customized '57 Reissue Fender Stratocaster equipped with three Fender Lace Sensor pickups (the Lace Sensor Blue in the neck position, the Lace Sensor Silver in the middle position, and the Lace Sensor Red at the bridge position). It also has a five-position pickup selector switch which he installed himself. This battered Strat became his number one guitar by default. He owned a '74 Strat that was stolen shortly after Gish was completed. Corgan was reunited with this guitar in early 2019.

Corgan also used a wide variety of guitars on Mellon Collie and the Infinite Sadness. On "Where Boys Fear to Tread", Corgan used a Les Paul Junior Reissue, and on "Tonight Tonight" he used a '72 Gibson ES-335. He is also known to use a '74 Strat which has since been painted baby blue. That guitar was used on the recordings for "Bullet with Butterfly Wings" and also "Muzzle", because the heavier wood gave it the basic Strat sound with a bit more bottom.

During the recording and tour of the album Zeitgeist, Corgan used a Schecter C-1 EX baritone, finished in black with Tony Iommi signature pickups. Corgan also endorsed Reverend Guitars in his Zwan era, most notably playing a Reverend Slingshot.

In 2008 Corgan released to the market his own Fender Stratocaster. This new guitar was made to Corgan's exact specs to create his famous mid-'90s buzzsaw tone; the instrument features three DiMarzio pickups (two custom for this instrument), a string-through hardtail bridge and a satin nitrocellulose lacquer finish. When playing live, he uses both his signature Strats as well as two other Fender Strats, one in red with a white pick guard and one in silver-grey with a black pick guard; a Gibson Tony Iommi signature SG; and his Schecter C-1 (only used on the Zeitgeist song "United States").

A video called 'Stompland' on the official Smashing Pumpkins YouTube channel is informative on Corgan's choice of effects pedals. In the video he reveals an extensive collection of pedals used throughout his career with the Smashing Pumpkins. Corgan's tone is often characterized by his use of fuzz pedals, particularly vintage versions of the Electro-Harmonix Big Muff

In 2016 Reverend Guitars released the BC-1 Billy Corgan signature guitar featuring Railhammer Billy Corgan signature pickups.

The Reverend Billy Corgan Signature Terz was launched at the 2018 NAMM show—an electric version of a 19th-century instrument that is played as if the guitar is capoed at the third fret, and tuned G-g standard. Corgan often uses the capo at the third fret and asked for a higher-register guitar.

Corgan is noted for having used Marshall and Diezel amps. He has also used modular preamps based on many different amps in conjunction with Mesa Boogie poweramps. The preamps were custom built by Salvation Mods.

In August 2017, Corgan sold a large collection of instruments and gear used throughout his career via music gear website Reverb.

In 2020, Billy Corgan collaborated with Brian Carstens of Carstens Amplification to produce Grace, Billy's first and only signature guitar amplifier to date.

Discography

Solo

Albums

Singles

Soundtrack work

1996: Ransom
1997: First Love, Last Rites ("When I Was Born, I Was Bored")
1999: Stigmata
2000: Any Given Sunday (Corgan is credited on "Be A Man" by Hole)
2002: Spun (Corgan wrote original songs for this soundtrack)
2006: "Dance of the Dead" (episode of Masters of Horror)
2007: When a Man Falls in the Forest (three previously unreleased songs)
2011: The Chicago Code (Corgan performs the opening theme, written by Robert Duncan)
2018: Rampage – "The Rage" Performed by Kid Cudi featuring vocals by Corgan (from the Smashing Pumpkins track Bullet with Butterfly Wings)

Albums featured

1991: Sparkle (by Catherine, The EP is produced by Corgan)
1994: Songs About Girls (by Catherine, The song "It's No Lie" is produced by Corgan)
1994: Chante Des Chanson Sur Les Filles (by Catherine, The EP is produced by Corgan as "Johhny Goat")
1994: Sleepy EP (by Catherine, The EP is produced by Corgan)
1996: Guitars That Rule the World, Vol. 2: Smell the Fuzz:The Superstar Guitar Album (by Various Artists, Corgan is credited as writer and performer of "Ascendo")
1997: Starjob (by The Frogs, The EP is produced by Corgan as "Johhny Goat")
1997: Troublizing (by Ric Ocasek, Corgan is credited as writer of "Asia Minor" and playing guitar on "The Next Right Moment", "Crashland Consequence", "Situation", "Fix on You" and "People We Know")
1998: Celebrity Skin (by Hole, Corgan is credited as co-writer of "Celebrity Skin", "Hit So Hard", "Malibu", "Dying" and "Petals")
1998: "I Belong to You" single (by Lenny Kravitz, Corgan remixed the second track "If You Can't Say No (Flunky in the attic Mix)")
1998: Mechanical Animals by Marilyn Manson, Corgan performed backing vocals on Speed of Pain, although not credited, he is thanked in the album credits.
1999: Paraphernalia (by Enuff Z'Nuff, Corgan is credited as guitarist on the song "Everything Works If You Let It")
2000: Iommi (by Tony Iommi, Corgan is credited as writer of and vocalist on "Black Oblivion")
2001: Get Ready (by New Order, Corgan is contributing voice on "Turn My Way")
2002: Kissin Time (by Marianne Faithfull, Corgan is credited as writer of "Wherever I Go", "I'm on Fire" and contributing on "Something Good")
2003: "Lights Out" single (by Lisa Marie Presley, Corgan is credited as writer of "Savior")
2004: We Are Not Alone (by Breaking Benjamin, Corgan is credited as writer of "Follow", "Forget It" and "Rain")
2004: The Essential Cheap Trick (by Cheap Trick, Corgan is playing guitar on the live recording of the track "Mandocello")
2004: About a Burning Fire (by Blindside, Corgan is playing guitar on "Hooray, It's L.A.")
2005: Life Begins Again (by Jimmy Chamberlin Complex, Corgan is contributing voice on "Loki Cat")
2005: Blue-Sky Research (by Taproot, Corgan wrote the track "Lost in the Woods" and co-wrote the tracks "Violent Seas" and "Promise")
2006: ONXRT:Live From The Archives Volume 9 (A compilation CD from the radio station 93 WXRT in Chicago features the live recording of the track "A100")
2007: Humanity: Hour I (by Scorpions, Corgan is contributing voice on "The Cross")
2010: Nobody's Daughter (by Hole, Corgan is credited as co-writer of "Pacific Coast Highway", "Samantha" and "Loser Dust")
2010: See My Friends (by Ray Davies, Corgan is featured in the song "All Day And All of the Night/Destroyer")
2011: Ghost on the Canvas (by Glen Campbell, Corgan is featured in the song ."There's No Me... Without You")
2011: Fancy Space People (by Fancy Space People, Corgan is credited as engineer and playing guitar)
2014: Did You Miss Me (on The Veronicas by The Veronicas, guitar contributions)
2019: The Nothing (by Korn, Corgan is credited as co-writer of "You'll Never Find Me")
2019: Blvds Of Splendor  (by Cherie Currie, Corgan provides guitar, bass and  Backing Vocals  on "Blvds Of Splendor")
2019: Screamer (by Third Eye Blind, Corgan described as the "musical consigliere" of the album, and credited as co-writer of "Light It Up")
2020: Ceremony (by Phantogram, Corgan is credited as co-writer of "Into Happiness" and "Love Me Now")

As part of The Smashing Pumpkins

References

External links

The Smashing Pumpkins official website

BillyCorgan.Livejournal.com – An extensive 7-year archive of Billy's journal entries, including The Confessions of Billy Corgan, solo work and the revival of the Pumpkins.
Billy Corgan collection at the Internet Archive's live music archive
Poems by Billy Corgan at alittlepoetry.com Three poems from Blinking With Fists

 
1967 births
Living people
20th-century American guitarists
20th-century American singers
21st-century American guitarists
21st-century American singers
Alternative rock guitarists
Alternative rock singers
American alternative rock musicians
American libertarians
American bloggers
American former Christians
American male bloggers
American male guitarists
American male poets
American male singers
American male songwriters
American music video directors
American people of Irish descent
American people of Italian descent
American rock guitarists
American rock singers
American rock songwriters
Guitarists from Chicago
Impact Wrestling executives
Lead guitarists
People with mood disorders
People with obsessive–compulsive disorder
Professional wrestling promoters
Singers from Chicago
Songwriters from Illinois
Starchildren members
The Smashing Pumpkins members
American veganism activists
Writers from Chicago
Zwan members